Stary Kocin  is a village in the administrative district of Gmina Mykanów, within Częstochowa County, Silesian Voivodeship, in southern Poland.

The village has a population of 462.

References

Stary Kocin